The Hawaii Hilo Vulcans are the athletics sports teams for the University of Hawaii at Hilo, located in Hilo, Hawaii, in NCAA Division II intercollegiate sports. The Vulcans compete as members of the Pacific West Conference, in 12 varsity sports.

Varsity sports
Hawaii-Hilo sponsors 12 varsity sports, five for men and seven for women.

Women's volleyball 

The Vulcans women's volleyball team is the intercollegiate women's volleyball team of the University of Hawaii at Hilo. Established in 1978, the program has achieved two national championships, in 1979 and 1981, while also having success in achieving 12 regular season conference championships.

References

External links